Abryna grisescens is a species of beetle in the family Cerambycidae found in Eastern Asia in countries like Laos, Malaysia, Philippines and Thailand.

References

Beetles described in 1938
Beetles of Asia
Pteropliini